Larisa Ivanovna Udovichenko (born 29 April 1955, Vienna, Austria) is a Russian actress. People's Artist of Russia (1998).

Selected filmography 
 Die Fledermaus (1979)
 The Meeting Place Cannot Be Changed (1979)
 Little Tragedies (1979)
 I Ask to Accuse Klava K. of My Death (1979)
 Married Bachelor (1982)
 Mary Poppins, Goodbye (1983) as Mrs. Banks
 Dead Souls (1984)
 Dangerous for Your Life! (1985)
 The Most Charming and Attractive (1985)
 Winter Cherry (1985)
 Entrance to the Labyrinth (1989)
 Sons of Bitches (1990)
 What a Wonderful Game (1995)
 The Envy of Gods (2000)
 Kidnapping, Caucasian Style! (2014)

References

External links
  
 "Пробуждая в человеке эмоции" Интервью с Ларисой Удовиченко 
 Студия им.Горького "Откуда берутся дети" Интервью с Л.Удовиченко

1955 births
Actresses from Vienna
Russian film actresses
Living people
Soviet film actresses
People's Artists of Russia
State Prize of the Russian Federation laureates
Honored Artists of the RSFSR
20th-century Russian women